Akbar Muradov is an Azerbaijani paralympic sport shooter, bronze medalist of 2007 European Championships in Suhl and 2010 World Cup in Antalya and in Volmerange-les-Mines. Akbar Muradov is the 5th in World  Ranking List in Men's 10m Air Pistol. He presented Azerbaijan on 2012 Summer Paralympics. Muradov acquired his disability during the First Nagorno-Karabakh War.

Sources 

Living people
Azerbaijani male sport shooters
Paralympic shooters of Azerbaijan
Shooters at the 2012 Summer Paralympics
1968 births
21st-century Azerbaijani people